Pertti Ålander (born 12 December 1936) is a Finnish middle-distance runner. He competed in the men's 800 metres at the 1960 Summer Olympics.

References

External links
 

1936 births
Living people
Athletes (track and field) at the 1960 Summer Olympics
Finnish male middle-distance runners
Olympic athletes of Finland